Oleg Mamasakhlisi (born 25 November 1995) is a Georgian football player. He plays for Shukura Kobuleti.

Club career
He made his Georgia national football team debut on 23 January 2017 in a friendly game against Uzbekistan.

After his contract with Torpedo Kutaisi expired, in early 2022 Mamasakhlisi joined Shukura Kobuleti.

References

External links
 
 

1995 births
Living people
Footballers from Georgia (country)
Association football defenders
Georgia (country) international footballers
FC Torpedo Kutaisi players
FC Samtredia players
Erovnuli Liga players